Yeldurthy or Yeldurthi or Veldurthy is a Mandal in Medak district of Telangana, India.
The village has Kakateeya Sculpture was having old temple Anantha Padmanabha. A Kakateeya Kala Toranam and Kakateeya Sila Shasanam are  also appears in middle of the village. Main crops are Paddy and Sugar cane.

References

Mandals in Medak district